Tuy may refer to:

Places

Burkina Faso 
Tuy Province, in The Hauts-Bassins Region

Iran 
Tuy, Iran, a village in North Khorasan Province

Philippines 
Tuy, Batangas, a municipality in the Province of Batangas

Spain 
Tui, Pontevedra, a municipality in Galicia, spelled "Tuy" in Spanish

Venezuela 
 Ocumare del Tuy, a city in the state of Miranda
 Santa Teresa del Tuy, a city in the state of Miranda
 Tuy River

Vietnam 
 Tuy Đức District, Đắk Nông Province
 Tuy An District, Phú Yên Province
 Tuy Hòa, the capital city of Phú Yên Province
 Tuy Hoa Air Base, used by the United States Air Force during the Vietnam War
 Tuy Hòa Railway Station, a railway station on the North–South Railway
 Tuy Phong District, Bình Thuận Province
 Tuy Phước District, Bình Định Province

People
Hoàng Tụy (born 1927), Vietnamese mathematician
Lucas de Tuy (died 1249), Leonese cleric and historian

Broadcasting
TV-U Yamagata, A Japanese commercial broadcaster

See also
 Tui (disambiguation)